Joseph Isidore Samson (2 July 1793 – 28 March 1871) was a 19th-century French actor and playwright.

Life
Samson was born at Saint-Denis, near Paris, the son of a restaurateur. He took first prize for comedy at the Conservatoire in 1812, married an actress with whom he had toured in France, and joined the Comédie-Française in 1826. There he remained until 1863, creating more than 250 parts.

In 1829 Samson became a professor at the Conservatoire, under whom Rachel Félix (1821–1858), Rose Cheri (1824–1861), the Brohans and others were trained. He wrote several comedies, among them La Belle-Mère et le gendre (1826), and La Famille poisson (1846). Samson died in Paris on 28 March 1871.

Works
Theatre
La Fête de Molière, comédie épisodique in 1 act and in verse, Paris, Théâtre de l'Odéon, 15 January 1825
La Belle-mère et le gendre, comedy in 3 acts, in verse, Paris, Théâtre de l'Odéon, 20 April 1826
Un Veuvage, comedy in 3 acts and in verse, Paris, Théâtre-Français, 27 May 1842
Un Péché de jeunesse, comedy in 1 act, mingled with song, with Jules de Wailly. Paris, Théâtre du Vaudeville, 28 March 1843
La Famille Poisson, ou les Trois Crispins, comedy in 1 act, Paris, Théâtre-Français, 15 December 1845
La Dot de ma fille, comedy in 1 act, in verse, Paris, Théâtre-Français, 13 December 1854
Other
Collection des rapports faits par M. Samson, de l'Association de secours mutuels entre les artistes dramatiques, 1851 Text online
Mémoires de Samson, de la Comédie française, 1862 Text online
L'Art théâtral, 2 vols, 1863–1865

References

Attribution

Bibliography

Eugène de Mirecourt, Samson, J.-P. Roret, Paris, 1854 Text online
Madame Joseph-Isidore Samson, Rachel et Samson : souvenirs de théâtre, foreword by Jules Claretie, P. Ollendorff, Paris, 1898 Text online

External links
Mémoires de Samson

1793 births
1871 deaths
Burials at Montmartre Cemetery
French male stage actors
19th-century French dramatists and playwrights
Sociétaires of the Comédie-Française
18th-century French male actors
People from Saint-Denis, Seine-Saint-Denis
19th-century French male writers